In traditional logic, contraposition is a form of immediate inference in which a proposition is inferred from another and where the former has for its subject the contradictory of the original logical proposition's predicate. In some cases, contraposition involves a change of the former's quality (i.e. affirmation or negation). For its symbolic expression in modern logic, see the rule of transposition. Contraposition also has philosophical application distinct from the other traditional inference processes of conversion and obversion where equivocation varies with different proposition types.

Traditional logic 

In traditional logic, the process of contraposition is a schema composed of several steps of inference involving categorical propositions and classes. A categorical proposition contains a subject and predicate where the existential impact of the copula implies the proposition as referring to a class with at least one member, in contrast to the conditional form of hypothetical or materially implicative propositions, which are compounds of other propositions, e.g. "If P, then Q" (P and Q are both propositions), and their existential impact is dependent upon further propositions where quantification existence is instantiated (existential instantiation), not on the hypothetical or materially implicative propositions themselves.

Full contraposition is the simultaneous interchange and negation of the subject and predicate, and is valid only for the type "A" and type "O" propositions of Aristotelian logic, while it is conditionally valid for "E" type propositions if a change in quantity from universal to particular is made (partial contraposition). Since the valid obverse is obtained for all the four types (A, E, I, and O types) of traditional propositions, yielding propositions with the contradictory of the original predicate, (full) contraposition is obtained by converting the obvert of the original proposition. For "E" statements, partial contraposition can be obtained by additionally making a change in quantity. Because nothing is said in the definition of contraposition with regard to the predicate of the inferred proposition, it can be either the original subject, or its contradictory, resulting in two contrapositives which are the obverts of one another in the "A", "O", and "E" type propositions.

By example: from an original, 'A' type categorical proposition,
 All residents are voters,

which presupposes that all classes have members and the existential import presumed in the form of categorical propositions, one can derive first by obversion the 'E' type proposition,
No residents are non-voters.

The contrapositive of the original proposition is then derived by conversion to another 'E' type proposition,
No non-voters are residents.
The process is completed by further obversion resulting in the 'A' type proposition that is the obverted contrapositive of the original proposition,
All non-voters are non-residents.

The schema of contraposition:

Notice that contraposition is a valid form of immediate inference only when applied to "A" and "O" propositions. It is not valid for "I" propositions, where the obverse is an "O" proposition which has no valid converse. The contraposition of the "E" proposition is valid only with limitations (per accidens). This is because the obverse of the "E" proposition is an "A" proposition which cannot be validly converted except by limitation, that is, contraposition plus a change in the quantity of the proposition from universal to particular.

Also, notice that contraposition is a method of inference which may require the use of other rules of inference. The contrapositive is the product of the method of contraposition, with different outcomes depending upon whether the contraposition is full, or partial. The successive applications of conversion and obversion within the process of contraposition may be given by a variety of names.

The process of the logical equivalence of a statement and its contrapositive as defined in traditional class logic is not one of the axioms of propositional logic. In traditional logic there is more than one contrapositive inferred from each original statement. In regard to the "A" proposition this is circumvented in the symbolism of modern logic by the rule of transposition, or the law of contraposition. In its technical usage within the field of philosophic logic, the term "contraposition" may be limited by logicians (e.g. Irving Copi, Susan Stebbing) to traditional logic and categorical propositions. In this sense the use of the term "contraposition" is usually referred to by "transposition" when applied to hypothetical propositions or material implications.

See also 

 Aristotle
 Square of opposition
 Categorical proposition#Contraposition
 Contraposition
 Converse (logic)
 Inference
 Obversion
 Organon
 Propositional calculus
 Syllogism
 Term logic
 Transposition (logic)

Notes

References 
 Blumberg, Albert E. "Logic, Modern". Encyclopedia of Philosophy, Vol.5, Macmillan, 1973.
 Brody, Bobuch A. "Glossary of Logical Terms". Encyclopedia of Philosophy. Vol. 5-6, p. 61. Macmillan, 1973.
 Copi, Irving. Introduction to Logic.  MacMillan, 1953.
 Copi, Irving. Symbolic Logic.  MacMillan, 1979, fifth edition.
 Prior, A.N. "Logic, Traditional". Encyclopedia of Philosophy, Vol.5, Macmillan, 1973.
 Stebbing, Susan. A Modern Introduction to Logic. Cromwell Company, 1931.

Rules of inference
Immediate inference

fr:Propriété contraposée
ia:Contraposition